Hiscutt is a surname. Notable people with the surname include:

Des Hiscutt (born 1933), Australian politician
Hugh Hiscutt (born 1926), Australian politician, brother of Des
Leonie Hiscutt (born 1959), Australian politician, niece of Des and Hugh

See also
Hiscott